(died 1566) was a Japanese samurai of the Sengoku era who served the Amago clan. Hisakane was the son of Uyama Hisahide and served as a direct vassal to Amago Yoshihisa.

References 

Samurai
1566 deaths
Year of birth unknown